Echo is the second studio album by English singer Leona Lewis. It was released on 9 November 2009 including 16 November in the United Kingdom, and 17 November 2009 in the United States. Its worldwide release was through Sony Music. The album charted across the globe, including the US, UK, Canada, across Europe, Mexico, Australia and New Zealand, with commercial success.

Lewis worked with Ryan Tedder, Justin Timberlake, Max Martin, John Shanks, and Harvey Mason, Jr. amongst others to produce the follow-up to her debut album Spirit. The album was preceded by the single "Happy", released on 15 September 2009. "I Got You" was released as the second single in February 2010. The song "My Hands" was used as the theme song for the video game Final Fantasy XIII. The album achieved commercial success, peaking within the top twenty in nine countries, including debuting at number one in the UK with 161,000 copies sold in its first week. Lewis promoted the album along with her debut record on The Labyrinth, her debut headlining concert tour, starting in May 2010.

Background and production
As with Lewis's debut album, Spirit, each of Echos producers were enlisted by her mentors Simon Cowell and Clive Davis. Unlike her debut album where she travelled between cities, Lewis remained in Los Angeles for the recording of Echo, which took nine months to produce. It contains ballads, racier tracks and dancefloor anthems. Lewis titled the album Echo "since an echo describes a big, organic sound," and it appealed to her love of fantasy as Echo was a nymph who, in Greek mythology, "pined away till only her voice remained." In August 2009 Lewis told her official website: "I'm in the midst of the recording process, working with incredible songwriters and producers, and my music has really evolved. It's so exciting to create something new." She also said, "I'm actually more confident with this album than the last. I've taken more control this time and I feel more at ease with everything." She told Variety magazine that she "wanted the album to have a little bit more of a live feel to it, with a little more live instrumentation," and described Echo as "more guitar-driven" compared to Spirit, with a "harder edge" in an interview with Seventeen.

Lewis worked with Ryan Tedder, producer of her second single "Bleeding Love", on the album's lead single "Happy", written by Lewis, Tedder and Evan Bogart, and "You Don't Care". Tedder commented, "I pushed [Lewis] vocally more on this song than any song she's ever done. I mean, she did some stuff on "Happy" that's awesome, but this other song she takes it to another level." The song "Lost Then Found" was also co-written by Tedder and Lewis along with Dan Muckala, Jess Cates and Lindy Robbins, and features Tedder's band OneRepublic. Another Tedder song, "Shadows", was written with AJ McLean for the Backstreet Boys. After it failed to make the Backstreet Boys' album, Cowell wanted it for Lewis but then decided it better suited Westlife.

Justin Timberlake contributed production and backing vocals to several songs, including "Don't Let Me Down", written and produced with Timberlake's production team The Y's and recorded at Chalice Recording Studios. Arnthor Birgisson worked with Lewis on the songs "My Hands" and "Heartbeat", which were written by Ina Wroldsen and Birgisson. "My Hands" features on Echo, while "Heartbeat" is the B-side for the album's second single. Max Martin and Birgisson worked with Lewis on the song "I Got You" with Martin also contributing to the dance track "Outta My Head" written by Martin, Johan Karl Schuster and Kotecha. Schuster also produced the upbeat "Naked" along with Kristian Lundin. It was written by Lewis, Lundin and Kotecha.

John Shanks produced two songs, a ballad and an uptempo song, one of which is "Broken", written by Shanks, Novel and Lewis. Julian Bunetta worked with Lewis along with Andrew Frampton to produce "Brave", which was written by Frampton, Bunetta, Kotecha and Lewis. Kevin Rudolf produced "Love Letter", which he co-wrote with J. Kasher. In September 2009, Lewis worked with Harvey Mason, Jr., Uriel Kadouch, Keith Ross, and Gavriel Aminov to produce "Can't Breathe". The album also contains a cover of Oasis's "Stop Crying Your Heart Out", which was produced by Steve Robson.

Lewis also worked with several writers and producers on songs that failed to make the album. Toby Gad worked with Lewis including writing the song "Unreachable" with Lewis and Robbins. Taio Cruz was hired by Cowell to write and produce tracks for the album, and Irish Indie band The Script agreed to write a song, however, it was submitted too late. Production and songwriting team Xenomania were reported to have written five songs for Lewis's second album, described by songwriter Miranda Cooper as "tragic songs with a twist." Ne-Yo wrote songs for the album, including "Can't Fight It". Lewis expressed interest in working with Chris Martin of Coldplay to give the album a rockier edge, though a collaboration never came to light. Lewis collaborated with rock singer Aqualung. She was also reported to have worked with DJ Infamous, Claude Kelly, and Los Da Mystro. She worked with Timbaland in April 2009, and explained the reason for his tracks not appearing on Echo: "I went in the studio with Timbaland and we vibed out. The thing is, on this album, there were a lot of people that I'd been with on the first album so I knew them and we kinda got into the vibe straight away. Obviously I'm still getting to know Timbaland, it's kind of a continuing and evolving relationship, so this time he's not on the album, but hopefully next time he will be".

The album was released in two formats. In addition to the standard edition,  albums downloaded from iTunes receive two live performance songs. The two live songs, "Brave" and "The First Time Ever I Saw Your Face", were recorded at a concert at London's Hackney Empire on 2 November 2009. In July 2010 it was reported by the Sunday Mirror that a deluxe edition is planned for release.

Theft of demo and unauthorised leaks
In August 2009, several of the album's unfinished songs leaked onto the internet and it is believed that computers at Lewis's record label were hacked into. An investigation was launched by the International Federation of the Phonographic Industry (IFPI), working with the record label and police to identify those responsible. Lewis confirmed during an interview with an Australian radio station that some of the songs that leaked would be included on the album. At the end of March 2010 it was reported that Syco Music had suffered once again from computer hackers who obtained 14 previously unreleased songs by Lewis and subsequently leaked them online. It was also revealed that Cowell had contacted the FBI regarding the matter, while British police were contacted to investigate the leak of Echo in November 2009 before it was officially released. It was later revealed in 2011 that songs recorded for Echo were targeted by the German hacker, Deniz A., also known as DJ Stolen. In July 2010, the Rasch law firm logged a criminal complaint against DJ Stolen for "constantly placing hacked songs on the internet". Amongst those songs listed in the complaint was one called "Pulse", described at the time as a new recording by Lewis. DJ Stolen was jailed for 18 months in June 2011.

Artwork
In an interview with Seventeen magazine, Lewis described the album's packaging and design as having a desert setting. Each of Lewis's outfits, described as "modern, 'heroine' gowns", was designed by Vivienne Westwood. Each gown was made-to-measure in Westwood's central London atelier. They are created in gold lamé and white satin, are fitted around a boned leotard and feature the designer's signature cleavage-enhancing corset, with a crinoline-style skirt. One costume depicts Lewis as a mermaid, an idea that Lewis suggested. Lewis also wears Westwood's dresses in her music videos and during promotional events for the album and singles.

Promotion
Lewis was scheduled to appear on the BBC's The One Show on 14 October 2009, but she pulled out following an incident at a booksigning of her autobiography Dreams where a man punched her in the face. She also cancelled a two-day promotional trip to Germany. She rescheduled her appearance on The One Show to 26 October. Lewis performed an exclusive live show at the Hackney Empire in London on 2 November 2009, her first full UK show, where she performed nine songs in total, including four from Echo. On 5 November 2009 she has also performed "Happy" at the MTV Europe Music Awards 2009 held in Berlin, Germany. Lewis performed again on The X Factor final, on 13 December, singing her rendition of "Stop Crying Your Heart Out". Following this performance, the song charted at 29 in the UK singles charts from strong downloads. On 3 December 2009, Lewis performed "Happy", "I Got You" and "Stop Crying Your Heart Out", as well as two songs from Spirit, on the BBC Radio 2 show Live Sessions with Ken Bruce. She also performed "I Got You" and "Stop Crying Your Heart Out" on BBC Radio 1's Live Lounge.

Tour

Lewis started her debut tour, The Labyrinth, in May 2010, supporting Spirit and Echo with dates in the United Kingdom and Republic of Ireland.

Singles
"Happy", the first single from the album, was released to download in the United States and Canada in September 2009, and worldwide in November 2009. It reached number 31 on the US Billboard Hot 100, and number 15 on the Canadian Hot 100. In the Australian ARIA Singles Chart it reached number 26. In Billboard Japan Hot 100 it reached number 7. It also charted in the Dutch Single Top 100 at number 74 and in New Zealand at 35. "Happy" entered the UK chart at number 2 and was certified Silver (200,000+). "I Got You" was released as the second and final single in the UK on 21 February 2010 and peaked at number 14 on the UK Singles Chart and number 3 on the UK R&B Chart.

Other songs
Although not released as a single, "Stop Crying Your Heart Out", a cover of an Oasis song, charted at number 29 on the UK Singles Chart in late 2009, following Lewis's live performance on The X Factor. The track "My Hands" was chosen as the theme song for the video game Final Fantasy XIIIs release in North America and Europe.

Critical reception

Critical response to the album has been mixed, based on a score of 59 out of 100 from review aggregator site Metacritic. The Observers review of Echo gave the album three out of five stars, with reviewer Peter Robinson writing, "Unusually for an X Factor graduate, there was actually something at risk if the second album didn't work, but Echo hits its target. A handful of upbeat numbers – including an unexpected foray into frothy high-speed electro – pull Leona back from the brink of boring." Jim Farber of the New York Daily News agreed, writing "Echo has a sense of fun, and a youthful vim, rarely on display on Spirit. It's faster, harder and way catchier." Neil McCormick, writing in The Daily Telegraph, said Lewis's "mezzo-soprano range allows her to take melodies from luxurious low notes to high-flying falsetto, gliding with elegant power and impressive control through all kinds of fluctuations and modulations. [...] The approach of the album's producers is to throw Leona at a song, with multi-tracked vocals shooting off in every direction, until you feel like you're listening to a room full of cloned divas fighting over who gets the top line. It's an exhausting yet strangely exhilarating experience." Heats Karen Edwards awarded the album five stars out of five, saying "From girlie pop to big ballads, this album will remind you what the fuss is all about. Future X Factor winners take note: this is what real talent sounds like."

On the other hand, some reviews were harsh, Entertainment Weekly said that "Too much of "Echo" is mired in soppy balladry and standard-issue dancery" adding that "When it works, however, as on the soaring Happy and feathery, synth-laden I Got You, all is (momentarily) redeemed". The Guardian said that "Echo's 13 tracks, which were co-written by Justin Timberlake, OneRepublic's Ryan Tedder and other costly names, follow the formula of her debut: the slow, piano-accented build-up, punctuated by sharp intakes of breath and vocal curlicues, then the climactic explosion as the drums crash in and she hits the chorus. That voice is impressive enough and there's no denying the stolid catchiness of some songs – notably Happy and her cover of Oasis's Stop Crying Your Heart Out – but she appears to lack the lightness of touch this album desperately needs". Slant Magazine stated that "...less compelling material, particularly in the album's second half, finds Lewis's talent squandered. The gooier adult contemporary numbers, of which "I Got You" is the worst, tend to add a lot of unnecessary vocal doctoring to the mix, edging on the faceless robo-pop that has become all too ubiquitous in the age of Auto-Tune. And too much of the album's runtime is dominated by altogether thoughtless ballads, like the languid late-album duo of "Stop Crying Your Heart Out" and "Don't Let Me Down," in which Lewis confronts dull, piano-driven arrangements with vocals that, while technically unimpeachable, lack any warmth or emotional expression".

Commercial performance
Echo made its first chart appearance on the Irish Albums Chart at number two. In Belgium the album charted at 69 on the Flanders Album Chart and 67 on the Wallonia albums chart. Echo debuted at Number 1 on the UK Album Charts on 22 November selling 161,000 copies and has since been certified double platinum in the UK. In the United States, the album debuted at number 13 on the US Billboard 200 with over 69,000 units sold. but in the second week sales fell by 68% to just 21,431.

Track listingNotes'''
  signifies co-producer
  signifies additional producer
  "Lost Then Found" includes the hidden track "Stone Hearts & Hand Grenades", which starts at 7:05 minutes after three minutes of silence.

Personnel
Credits taken from Echos liner notes.
Managerial
Executive producers – Simon Cowell, Clive Davis
Production co-ordination – Angela N. Golightly

Performance
Lead vocals – Leona Lewis
Background vocals – Lewis, Ryan Tedder, Brent Kutzle, Justin Timberlake, Mandy Foster, Vicky Sandström, Cheryline "Che'Nelle" Lim, Stephen Simmonds, Sara-Jane Skeet, Beverly Skeet

Instruments

Acoustic guitar – Tedder
Bass guitar – Juliene Bunetta, John Shanks, Kutzle, John Garrison
Cello – Kutzle
Choir arrangement – Lawrence Johnson
Drums – Tedder, Bunetta, Vinnie Colaiuta, Karl Brazil, Eddie Fisher
Drum programming – Tedder, Zancanella
Guitars – Andrew Frampton, Shanks, Esbjörn Öhrwall, Luke Potashnick
Instruments on "Can't Breathe" – Uriel "Frenchie" Kadouch, "Vein"
Instruments on "Love Letter" – Kevin Rudolf

Instruments on "Naked" – Karl "Shellback" Schuster
Other instrumentation on "Lost Then Found" – Tedder, Kutzle
Keyboards – Frampton, Shanks, Charles Judge
Piano – Tedder, Frampton, Kristian Lundin, Steve Robson, Dan Muckala
Strings – Christine Wu, Urban Soul Orchestra, London Session Orchestra
Strings arrangement – Stephen Hussey, Will Malone, Larry Gold
Strings conductor – Hussey
Synthesiser – Tedder, Kutzle

Technical

Arrangement – Tedder, Muckala
Co-production – Mike Elizondo, Mason, Kutzle, Noel Zancanella, Muckala
Digital editing – Ron Taylor
Engineering – Tedder, Bunetta, Zancanella, Craig Durrance, Joe Zook, Rich Cooper, Damian Lewis, Jeff Rothschild, Alex Gibson, Richard Flack
Engineering assistants – Chris Kasych, Richard Woodcraft, Nicolas Esaig, Paul LaMalfa, Keith Armstrong, Nik Karpen
Mastering – Vlado Meller
Mixing – Phil Tan, Serban Ghenea, Manny Marroquin, Chris Lord-Alge, Jeremy Wheatley, Jean-Marie Horvat
Mixing assistants – Tim Roberts, Christian Plata, Erik Madrid, Mimi Parker
Mixing engineers – John Hanes, Brad Townsend, Andrew Schubert

Production – Tedder, Arnthor Birgisson, Julian Bunetta, Kadouch, Frampton, Max Martin, Shellback, "Vein", Shanks, Lundin, Robson, The Y's
Programming – Tedder, Rothschild, Dan Chase
Pro-Tools editing – Lars Fox
Recording – Birgisson, Shellback, Rich Cooper, Andrew Hey, Ann Minciel, Seth Waldmann, Neil Tucker, Joshua Berkman, Paul Foley
Recording assistant – Christian Baker
Vocal engineering – Seth Waldmann
Vocal production – Lewis, Tedder, Birgisson, Bunetta, Frampton, Rudolf, Foster, Shanks, Lundin, Robson, Harvey Mason, Jr., Timberlake
Vocal recording – Dabling Harward
Vocal recording assistants – David Boyd, Michael Daley

Recording locations

Abbey Road Studios, London
Chalice Recording Studios, Hollywood
CMK Studios, Los Angeles
Conway Studios, Los Angeles
Dean Street Studios, London
Germano Studios, New York City
Henson Recording Studios, Hollywood

Maratone Studios, Stockholm
Mason Sound, North Hollywood
Park Hill Studios, Denver
The Rabbit Hole, Calabasas
RAK Recording Studios, London
Sphere Studios, London
The Vault, Stockholm
Westlake Studios, Los Angeles

Charts

Weekly charts

Year-end charts

Certifications

Release history

References

External links
 
 "Happy"/Echo microsite
 
 Echo at Metacritic
 [ Echo] at Billboard''

2009 albums
Leona Lewis albums
Albums produced by Clive Davis
Albums produced by Jeff Bhasker
Albums produced by Max Martin
Albums produced by Justin Timberlake
Albums produced by John Shanks
Albums produced by Ryan Tedder
J Records albums
Syco Music albums